Angels Crest is a 2011 American-Canadian independent drama film directed by Gaby Dellal and starring Thomas Dekker, Elizabeth McGovern, Jeremy Piven and Mira Sorvino. The film was adapted from the novel of the same name by Leslie Schwartz. It was marketed in the UK as Abandoned.

Cast

References

External links

2011 films
2011 drama films
American drama films
English-language Canadian films
Canadian drama films
Films based on American novels
Films shot in Calgary
Films directed by Gaby Dellal
2010s English-language films
2010s American films
2010s Canadian films